Cindy Ouellet (born December 8, 1988) is a Canadian Paralympic wheelchair basketball player.

Early life
Cindy Ouellet was born on December 8, 1988, in Rivière-du-Loup, Quebec, Canada. At age 12, she was diagnosed with bone cancer which quickly ended her dream of becoming a soccer player and skier.

Career
Ouellet took up wheelchair basketball in 2005. She is classified as a 3.5 point player. She won a gold medal in 2007 at Canada Games for Quebec, and joined the women's senior team later that year. She made her Paralympic debut at the 2008 Summer Paralympics in Beijing. At the 2010 World Championships in Birmingham she won a bronze one following by a silver medal at the 2011 Parapan American Games in Guadalajara, Mexico.

In 2011, Ouellet joined Canada's first-ever Women's U25 National Team, which she led at the inaugural Women's U25 World Wheelchair Basketball Championships  in St. Catharines, Ontario, in July 2011. Ouellet was named to the all-star team and finished fourth in overall tournament scoring. She was named MVP of the 2011 CWBL Women's National Championships after leading Quebec to its first-ever gold medal victory.

, she is attending University of Alabama, where she wants to get PhD in biomedical engineering, and participates in the women's wheelchair basketball team there. In 2013, she was awarded a Queen Elizabeth II Diamond Jubilee Medal and was again named MVP at the CWBL Women's Championship. She was part of the team that won a gold medal at the 2014 Women's World Wheelchair Basketball Championship in Toronto in July 2014, and silver at the 2015 Parapan American Games in August 2015.

In 2016, she participated at CrossFit weight lifting competition.

In a 2018 interview with Radio Canada, she said that she will participate in 2 more Paralympic competitions. She mentioned that if it won't be in South Korea it will be in Tokyo in 2020 and 2022 Winter Paralympics in Beijing, China.

Awards
Queen Elizabeth II Diamond Jubilee Medal  (2013)
Wheelchair Basketball Canada Female Athlete of the Year (2012)
Women's U25 World Championships tournament all-star team (2011)
CWBL Women's National Championships tournament all-star team (2012)
CWBL Women's National Championships tournament all-star team (2010)
Wheelchair Basketball Canada Junior Athlete of the Year (2007)

References

External links
 
 
 

1988 births
Living people
Paralympic wheelchair basketball players of Canada
Canadian women's wheelchair basketball players
Sportspeople from Quebec
People from Rivière-du-Loup
Wheelchair basketball players at the 2008 Summer Paralympics
Wheelchair basketball players at the 2012 Summer Paralympics
Wheelchair basketball players at the 2016 Summer Paralympics
Wheelchair basketball players at the 2020 Summer Paralympics
University of Alabama alumni
Cross-country skiers at the 2018 Winter Paralympics
Paralympic cross-country skiers of Canada